Thornaby is a railway station on the Tees Valley Line, which runs between  and  via . It is owned by Network Rail and managed by TransPennine Express.

History

The station lies on the original Stockton & Darlington Railway (S&DR) extension to Port Darlington, developed from 1828 under the instructions of influential Quaker banker, coal mine owner and S&DR shareholder Joseph Pease, who had sailed up the River Tees to find a suitable new site down river of Stockton on which to place new coal staithes. As a result, in 1829 he and a group of Quaker businessmen bought  of land described as "a dismal swamp", and established the Middlesbrough Estate Company. Through the company, the investors intended to develop both a new port, and a suitable town to supply its labour. On 27 December 1830, the S&DR opened an extension across the river to a station at Newport, almost directly north of the current Middlesbrough station. The S&DR quickly later renamed this new station and associated six-coal staithe dock facility as Port Darlington, hoping to market the facility further. So successful was the port, a year after opening the population of Port Darlington had reached 2,350. However, with Port Darlington overwhelmed by the volume of imports and exports, in 1839 work started on Middlesbrough Dock. Laid out by Sir William Cubitt, the whole infrastructure was built by resident civil engineer George Turnbull. After three years and an expenditure of £122,000 (equivalent to £9.65 million at 2011 prices), the formal opening occurred on 12 May 1842. On completion, the docks were bought by the S&DR.

As Middlesbrough developed, additional railway facilities were required to marshall goods wagons, and allow workers to access the docks and associated industries. So in 1882 the then named South Stockton railway station was built by the North Eastern Railway (NER), and opened on 1 October. However, in 1892 Parliament granted a charter that created the Borough of Thornaby-on-Tees, which incorporated the village of Thornaby and South Stockton, and so on 1 November 1892 the name of the station was also changed.

Thornaby was located on a busy and hence important section of the line for the NER, between Newport and Middlesbrough Docks to the east, and Bowesfield Junction to the west (where the Northallerton/Darlington and Durham Coast Lines diverge), which had the busiest signal box on the NER system. The main station structure had a glass-covered entrance in a unique design of ironwork, which led to a booking office and waiting rooms for four classes. Built of brick, the additional stonework was made of creamy yellow stone. Carved embracing the Arts and Crafts Movement of William Morris, a competition between local stonemasons resulted in 104 different designs. The competition was noted on a brass plaque in the entrance area, which was removed and melted down as part of the war effort during World War II. The platform canopies were also of a unique ironwork design to Thornaby, but lost their glass after a Nazi Luftwaffe bomb fell close to the station during the war.

After being taken over by British Railways on nationalisation, the decayed station was never really repaired post war, but kept its proud staff and hence well kept flower borders. The variety of stone carvings also gained the station an entry in the newly created Guinness Book of Rail Facts and Feats.
With dwindling passenger numbers, staff were removed in the early 1970s, which led to a dramatic level of vandalism to the decayed station structures. After promises to refurbish the station due to local protests from 1977, demolition of the station buildings occurred in December 1981 in what was described locally as "institutionalised vandalism". In both 1988 and 1994, BR proposed to rename the resulting "bus shelter" station as Stockton, but this and a later proposal in 2000 by Northern Spirit to rename the station as South Stockton were stopped by local protests.

The stations revival occurred due to its being located next to the Teesdale development area and Durham University's Queen's Campus, and the provision of the new First TransPennine Express to Manchester Airport. This resulted in a £500,000 refurbishment in 2003 led by Arriva Trains Northern, the Strategic Rail Authority and Stockton-on-Tees borough council, that included the addition of waiting rooms for the first time in 25 years.

The newly rebuilt station was officially opened by former local MP Dari Taylor on 7 February 2003 and provides an enlarged car park, heated waiting room, staffed ticket office, a shop, VDU displays and better lighting and security. As a result of this improvement work, and the return of staffing, Thornaby won a National Station of the Year Award in the 2003 HSBC Rail Awards.

Services

London North Eastern Railway
London North Eastern Railway operate a daily return service between Middlesbrough and London King's Cross, calling at Thornaby.

As of the December 2021 timetable change, the station is served by one train per weekday each way. More services are planned following the completion of station works at Middlesbrough.

Rolling stock used: Class 800 Azuma

Northern Trains

Durham Coast Line

As of the May 2021 timetable change, the station is served by an hourly service between Newcastle and Middlesbrough. Most trains continue to Hexham (or Carlisle on Sunday) and Nunthorpe. Two trains per day (three on Sunday) continue to Whitby.

Rolling stock used: Class 156 Super Sprinter and Class 158 Express Sprinter

Tees Valley Line
As of the May 2021 timetable change, the station is served by two trains per hour between Saltburn and Darlington via Middlesbrough, with one train per hour extending to Bishop Auckland. An hourly service operates between Saltburn and Bishop Auckland on Sunday.

Rolling stock used: Class 156 Super Sprinter and Class 158 Express Sprinter

TransPennine Express
As of the December 2022 timetable change, the station is served by an hourly service between Saltburn and Manchester Airport via York. Most services run via Yarm, with the exception of one early morning arrival which travels via Darlington.

Rolling stock used: Class 185 Desiro

References

External links
 
 

Railway stations in the Borough of Stockton-on-Tees
DfT Category F2 stations
Former North Eastern Railway (UK) stations
Railway stations in Great Britain opened in 1882
Railway stations served by TransPennine Express
Northern franchise railway stations
Stockton and Darlington Railway
Thornaby-on-Tees
Railway stations served by London North Eastern Railway